Regal Records was an American record label owned by the Plaza Music Company that issued recordings from 1921 through 1931. Masters were recorded by Emerson Records, and issued mostly in chain stores for 50 cents each. Noted artists with records issued on Regal include Fletcher Henderson's Orchestra, Eubie Blake, Miss Frankie, the Original Memphis Five, Cab Calloway, and Duke Ellington.  The label was acquired in August 1922 by Scranton Button Company.

See also
 List of record labels
 Regal Records (disambiguation)

References

American record labels
Record labels established in 1921
Record labels disestablished in 1931
Jazz record labels